Mycotrupes is a genus of earth-boring scarab beetles in the family Geotrupidae. There are at least 5 described species in Mycotrupes.

Species
 Mycotrupes cartwrighti Olson & Hubbell, 1954
 Mycotrupes gaigei Olson & Hubbell, 1954 (North peninsular mycotrupes beetle)
 Mycotrupes lethroides (Westwood, 1837)
 Mycotrupes pedester Howden, 1954
 Mycotrupes retusus (LeConte, 1866) (sandhills earth boring scarab beetle)

References

Further reading

 Arnett, R.H. Jr., M. C. Thomas, P. E. Skelley and J. H. Frank. (eds.). (2002). American Beetles, Volume II: Polyphaga: Scarabaeoidea through Curculionoidea. CRC Press LLC, Boca Raton, FL.
 
 Richard E. White. (1983). Peterson Field Guides: Beetles. Houghton Mifflin Company.

Geotrupidae